Anthony Joshua vs. Carlos Takam was a heavyweight professional boxing match contested between undefeated and unified WBA (Super), IBF, and IBO champion Anthony Joshua, and the IBF's number three ranked contender, Carlos Takam. The bout took place on 28 October 2017 at the Principality Stadium in Cardiff, Wales. Joshua defeated Takam, retaining his heavyweight titles via tenth-round technical knockout (TKO).

Background
Following Joshua's win over Wladimir Klitschko in April 2017, unifying the WBA (Super) and IBF titles and capturing the IBO, the IBF granted Joshua an exemption from fighting their mandatory challenger, Kubrat Pulev, in order to allow Joshua to fulfil a contractual rematch obligation with Klitschko. After Klitschko announced his retirement on 3 August, the IBF ordered Joshua to negotiate a deal with Pulev by 3 September. On 5 September, Joshua's promoter, Eddie Hearn, officially announced Joshua vs. Pulev would take place on 28 October at the Principality Stadium in Cardiff, Wales. Less than two weeks before the fight, rumours began to circulate that Pulev had suffered an injury, putting the fight in jeopardy. The rumours proved to be true, leading Hearn to announce that Takam had stepped in to replace Pulev with just 12 days notice. Hearn also revealed that during the initial negotiations with Pulev, he had also been negotiating with Takam to be held in reserve as a replacement in the event that Pulev pulled out.

The Fight
Round one saw little action, with Joshua taking the centre of the ring while Takam remained on the back foot. The second round saw Joshua increase his punch output following an accidental headbutt, causing blood to flow from Joshua's nose. After a slow third round, the action picked up in the fourth with both fighters increasing their punch output. Takam received a cut above his right eye from a left hook early in the round. In the final 20 seconds, Joshua landed a solid counter left hook which caused Takam to stumble and touch the canvas with his right glove, scoring a knockdown for Joshua. The champion began landing punches on Takam with more frequency in the fifth. A minute into the round, referee Phil Edwards called a halt to the action to allow the ringside doctor to examine the cut above Takam's right eye. After a brief examination, Edwards resumed the contest. Despite being cut above the left eye in the seventh, Takam was able to land a few punches on the champion. At the beginning of the ninth round, Edwards once again halted the action to allow the ringside doctor to examine the cuts above Takam's eyes. With the doctor deeming Takam fit to continue, Edwards resumed the contest. The end came in the tenth after Joshua landed several unanswered punches on Takam, prompting Edwards to call off the fight, with Joshua retaining his titles via technical knockout.

Fight card

See also
List of undisputed world boxing champions

References

2017 in boxing
2017 in British sport
2017 in Welsh sport
Boxing in Wales
October 2017 sports events in the United Kingdom
2010s in Cardiff
International sports competitions hosted by Wales
Sports competitions in Cardiff
World Boxing Association heavyweight championship matches
International Boxing Federation heavyweight championship matches
International Boxing Organization heavyweight championship matches
Pay-per-view boxing matches
Boxing matches involving Anthony Joshua